The 1974 Birmingham International was a men's tennis tournament played on indoor carpet courts at the Birmingham Municipal Auditorium in Birmingham, Alabama, in the United States that was part of the 1974 USLTA Indoor Circuit. It was the second edition of the event and was held from February 13 through February 17, 1974. Top-seeded Jimmy Connors won the singles title and earned $5,000 first-prize money.

Finals

Singles
 Jimmy Connors defeated  Sandy Mayer 7–5, 6–3
 It was Connors' 4th singles title of the year and the 21st of his career.

Doubles
 Ian Fletcher /  Sandy Mayer defeated  Nicholas Kalogeropoulos /  Iván Molina 7–5, 6–7, 6–3

References

External links
 ITF tournament edition details

Birmingham International
Birmingham International
Birmingham International